Sakar is a village development committee in Baitadi District in the Mahakali Zone of western Nepal. At the time of the 1991 Nepal census it had a population of 2,996 and had 484 houses in the village.
Sakar in Nepali means "dream come true".

References

Populated places in Baitadi District